The 2015–16 Algerian Ligue Professionnelle 1 was the 54th season of the Algerian Ligue Professionnelle 1 since its establishment in 1962. A total of 16 teams contested the league.

ES Sétif came into the season as defending champions of the 2014–15 season. USM Blida, DRB Tadjenanet, and RC Relizane entered as the three promoted teams from the 2014–15 Algerian Ligue Professionnelle 2.

On 30 April 2016, USM Alger officially won the title for professional league. This was the football club's 7th title.

Teams

Personnel and kits

Managerial changes

Managerial changes during the 2012-13 campaign.

Pre-season

During the season

Foreign players

Results

League table

Result table

Leader week after week

Positions by round

Clubs season-progress

Season statistics

Top scorers

Updated to games played on 27 May 2016 Source: soccerway.com

Top assists

Updated to games played on 13 February 2016 Source:

Hat-tricks

Note
4 Player scored 4 goals5 Player scored 5 goals

Clean sheets

* Only goalkeepers who played all 90 minutes of a match are taken into consideration.
Updated to games played on 22 May 2016

Discipline

Players

Media coverage

See also
2015–16 Algerian Ligue Professionnelle 2
2015–16 Algerian Cup

References

Algerian Ligue Professionnelle 1 seasons
Algeria
1